Rogelio Delfín (born 4 September 1953) is a Bolivian footballer. He played in one match for the Bolivia national football team in 1979. He was also part of Bolivia's squad for the 1979 Copa América tournament.

References

External links
 

1953 births
Living people
Bolivian footballers
Bolivia international footballers
Association football defenders
Footballers from La Paz